Balangan Regency is one of the regencies in the Indonesian province of South Kalimantan. It covers an area of 1,878.30 km2, and had a population of 112,430 at the 2010 Census and 130,355 at the 2020 Census; the official estimate as at mid 2021 was 132,213, consisting of 66,821 males and 65,392 females.  The capital is Paringin. Motto: "Sanggam" (Banjarese), also an acronym for "Sanggup Bagawi Gasan Masyarakat" (Banjarese="Willing To Work for the Sake of the People").

Administrative Districts 
Balangan Regency consists of eight districts (kecamatan), tabulated below with their areas and population totals from the 2010 Census and 2020 Census, tohether with the official estimates for mid 2021. The table also includes the location of the district administrative centres, the number of administrative villages (rural desa and urban kelurahan) in each district, and its postal codes. 

Notes: (a) except the villages of Mangkayahu (postcode of 71614) and Layap (postcode of 71616). (a) except the villages of Bungin (postcode of 71617) and Batu Piring (postcode of 71618).

Climate
Paringin, the seat of the regency has a tropical rainforest climate (Af) with heavy rainfall year-round.

References

External links 

 

Regencies of South Kalimantan